Morville may refer to several places in Europe :

Belgium 

 Morville, Belgium, a part of Florennes in the province of Namur

England 

 Morville, Shropshire, a civil parish near Bridgnorth, Shropshire
 Morville Hall, a country house in Morville, Shropshire

France 

 Morville, Manche, in the Manche département 
 Morville, Vosges, in the Vosges département
 Morville-en-Beauce, in the Loiret département
 Morville-lès-Vic, in the Moselle département 
 Morville-sur-Andelle, in the Seine-Maritime département
 Morville-sur-Nied, in the Moselle département 
 Morville-sur-Seille, in the Meurthe-et-Moselle département